The Wild Rice River is a tributary of the Red River of the North, approximately  long, in southeastern North Dakota in the United States. Via the Red River, Lake Winnipeg, and the Nelson River, it is part of the watershed of Hudson Bay. Its tributaries also drain a small part of northeastern South Dakota. Despite its length, it is a fairly small stream, flowing at an average rate of approximately 100 cubic feet per second (3 m³/s).

The river was so named for the former abundance of wild rice along its course.

Course

It initially flows generally eastwardly in a winding course through Sargent and Richland counties, through the Tewaukon National Wildlife Refuge and past the towns of Cayuga, Mantador and Great Bend.

Flow rate
Readings of zero have also been recorded.

See also
List of rivers in North Dakota

References

Notes

Sources

Books

Websites

Software
Google Earth elevations for Geographic Names Information System coordinates.  Retrieved on 2007-06-15.

Rivers of North Dakota
Bodies of water of Cass County, North Dakota
Bodies of water of Richland County, North Dakota
Bodies of water of Sargent County, North Dakota
Tributaries of the Red River of the North